Association football is the national sport of Aruba. Aruban football has been influenced and helped greatly by the national Royal Dutch Football Association over the years. The Aruba national team is normally placed near the bottom of the FIFA World Rankings System.

History
The Arubaanse Voetbal Bond, which governs football on the island, was formed in 1932 although it did not affiliate to FIFA until 1988. The AVB is a member of the CONCACAF governing body. The national league competition, the Aruban Division di Honor, was established in 1960 with the most successful teams being SV Dakota with 15 titles and SV Estrella with twelve. Until 1985 Aruban clubs also entered the Netherlands Antilles Championship with two winning, SV Racing Club Aruba in 1965 and SV Estrella in 1970. There are currently 62 registered clubs in Aruba with a total of 10,700 players and 126 officials involved in the game.

League system

International
Although the Aruba national football team made its debut as early as 1924 Aruban players officially represented the Netherlands Antilles national football team until a split was finalised in 1986. Although attempts have been Aruba have never qualified for the FIFA World Cup or the CONCACAF Gold Cup. The country is also a member of the Caribbean Football Union but they have yet to qualify for the Caribbean Cup.

Football stadiums in Aruba

References

See also
Soccer in Saba